is a Japanese manga series by  Icori Ando.  It was serialized in Tokuma Shoten's seinen manga magazine Monthly Comic Ryū  from May 2016 to August 2018 and has been collected in 4tankōbon  volumes.

Overview

Setting
Butterfly Storage is set in a futuristic reality in which the government's Death Bureau agency  job is to collect, freeze and manage the souls of the deceased (which leave the human body in the form of a butterfly) before they disappear for good, 49 days after their host death. Using the butterflies, the family of the deceased can come in contact with their loved ones in the form of a 3D hologram.

Plot
Hyakushi Ono lost his entire family in a plane crash fourteen years ago. But since this tragedy, the body of Senri, his twin sister, is still intact while the butterfly that contains his soul was stolen by a mysterious individual during the accident, leaving her unconscious and in a vegetative state.

In order to get back his sister's butterfly, Ono joins the famous "Death Bureau", a state agency specialized in the capture, conservation and management of the butterflies.

References

External links
 Butterfly Storage at Monthly Comic Ryū 

2016 manga
Seinen manga
Tokuma Shoten manga